Christianity is a minority religion within Karnataka, a state of India. Mangalorean Catholics are a community of centuries, though there also are Mangalorean Protestants.

Denominations 
Apostolic Church
Bible Believing Churches in India
Blessing Youth Mission
Karnataka Baptist Convention
Hindustani Covenant Church
New Life Churches
United Basel Mission Church
Methodist Church
The Pentecostal Mission

Regional bodies 
A Roman Catholic Diocese of Mangalore, a Roman Catholic Diocese of Belgaum, a Roman Catholic Archdiocese of Bangalore, a Roman Catholic Diocese of Bellary, a Roman Catholic Diocese of Gulbarga, a Roman Catholic Diocese of Shimoga, a Roman Catholic Diocese of Mysore,  a Roman Catholic Diocese of Karwar, a Roman Catholic Diocese of Udupi are present in Karnataka. The second largest church in Karnataka is the Church of South India with Karnataka Central Diocese, Karnataka Northern Diocese and  the Karnataka Southern Diocese. Gangavathi has Mennonite Brethren Churches. An Anglican Body-India Christian Mission Church has its existence in Doddaballapur of Bangalore rural right from 1920s. There is also an Orthodox Diocese of Bangalore. The state had a relatively high number of anti-Christian attacks in 2009. In 2008, Karnataka had more than 100 anti-Christian attacks.

There are three Syro-Malabar eparchies in Karnataka: Mandya, Belthangady and Bhadravathi.

See also 
Christianity in India
Anti-Christian violence in Karnataka

References

 
Religion in Karnataka